Cambodia participated at the 16th Asian Games in Guangzhou, China.

Athletics

Men
Track and road events

Beach volleyball

Men

Board games

Xiangqi

Boxing

Men

Swimming

Men

Women

Taekwondo

Men

Women

Tennis

Men

Wrestling

Men
Freestyle

Greco-Roman

Women
Freestyle

Nations at the 2010 Asian Games
2010
Asian Games